Moćevići may refer to:
 Moćevići, Pljevlja
 Moćevići (Srebrenica)